Petza'el is a moshav and Israeli settlement in the West Bank. Located in the center of the Jordan Valley, 34.5 kilometers from the Green line, it falls under the jurisdiction of Bik'at HaYarden Regional Council. It is named for Phasael, older brother of Herod the Great, for whom he had named a city nearby in ancient times.

The international community considers Israeli settlements in the West Bank illegal under international law, but the Israeli and US governments dispute this.

History
According to ARIJ, in order to construct  Petza'el Israel confiscated land from two Palestinian villages:

• 1,242 dunams from Fasayil

• 176 dunams from Al-Jiftlik

The settlement was established near Ma'ale Efraim in 1970 by former soldiers who were members of the Moshavim Movement. The settlement was initially administered as both a moshav and a kibbutz. In 1975 the settlement moved to a location in the valley where the agricultural fields of the members were located. In recent years, the settlements has absorbed around 30 new families, mostly the children of the founding members.

Economy
Most of the settlement's residents earn their living from agriculture. The younger members work in both agriculture and other jobs.

In the 2013 the settlement had 3,960 dunams of cultivated land, of which 2,700 dunams was used for date palms, 800 for vineyards, 400 for vegetables (mostly peppers) and 60 for flowers. Most of the agricultural output is designated for export.
There are conflicting views about the builder of a race track near the settlement. Haaretz reported the illegal race track was built by the west bank regional council by using public funds.

Community and civic services
The settlement operates two kindergartens, several clubs for the members, a synagogue, pool, grocery store and recreation sites. Some of the electricity is created by solar panels in the settlements and some residents also use solar panels for their personal use.

References

Moshavim
Israeli settlements in the West Bank
Populated places established in 1970
1970 establishments in the Israeli Military Governorate